Horst Krause (born 18 December 1941) is a German actor.

Biography
Krause was born in Bönhof, (Benowo, Poland), the youngest of five children. Along with his family he was expelled to Ludwigsfelde in 1947. Krause worked as a machinist at the Brandenburger Traktorenwerke and started his acting career in the age of 23. From 1964 to 1967 he attended the Ernst Busch Academy of Dramatic Arts

From 1969 on Krause worked at the "Schauspielhaus Karl-Marx-Stadt" (Chemnitz) and from 1984 to 1994 at the Staatsschauspiel Dresden.

After the reunification of Germany  Krause became a popular TV-character in the Polizeiruf 110 series.

Awards 
 Deutscher Filmpreis 1993, No More Mr. Nice Guy (with Joachim Król)
 Stockholm International Film Festival 2003, best actor (Schultze Gets the Blues)

Filmography 
No More Mr. Nice Guy (Wir können auch anders …) (1993)
A Girl Called Rosemary (1996, TV film)
 (1996, TV film)
 (1998)
Schultze Gets the Blues (2003)
Krügers Odyssee (2017)
Küss die Hand, Krüger (2018)
Krauses Hoffnung (2019)

References

External links 
 
 Horst Krause on Filmportal.de

1941 births
Living people
German male stage actors
German male television actors
German male film actors
20th-century German male actors
21st-century German male actors
Actors from Dresden
Ernst Busch Academy of Dramatic Arts alumni
German Film Award winners